Jebu Donga is a 1975 Indian Telugu action film directed by V. Madhusudhana Rao starring Sobhan Babu and Manjula in the lead roles. The film was released on 14 August 1975.

Cast

Soundtrack

Reception
The film collected  in its second week,  in the first two weeks,  in the third week,  in the first three weeks and the film's final collection exceeded . It was the second highest-grossing film of the year 1975 behind another Sobhan Babu film, Soggadu.

Legacy
The title of the film was used for the 1987 Chiranjeevi film Jebu Donga.

References

External links
 

1970s Telugu-language films
Films directed by V. Madhusudhana Rao